= PACTL =

Chinese air cargo terminal operator

Shanghai Pudong International Airport Cargo Terminal Co., Ltd. (PACTL)
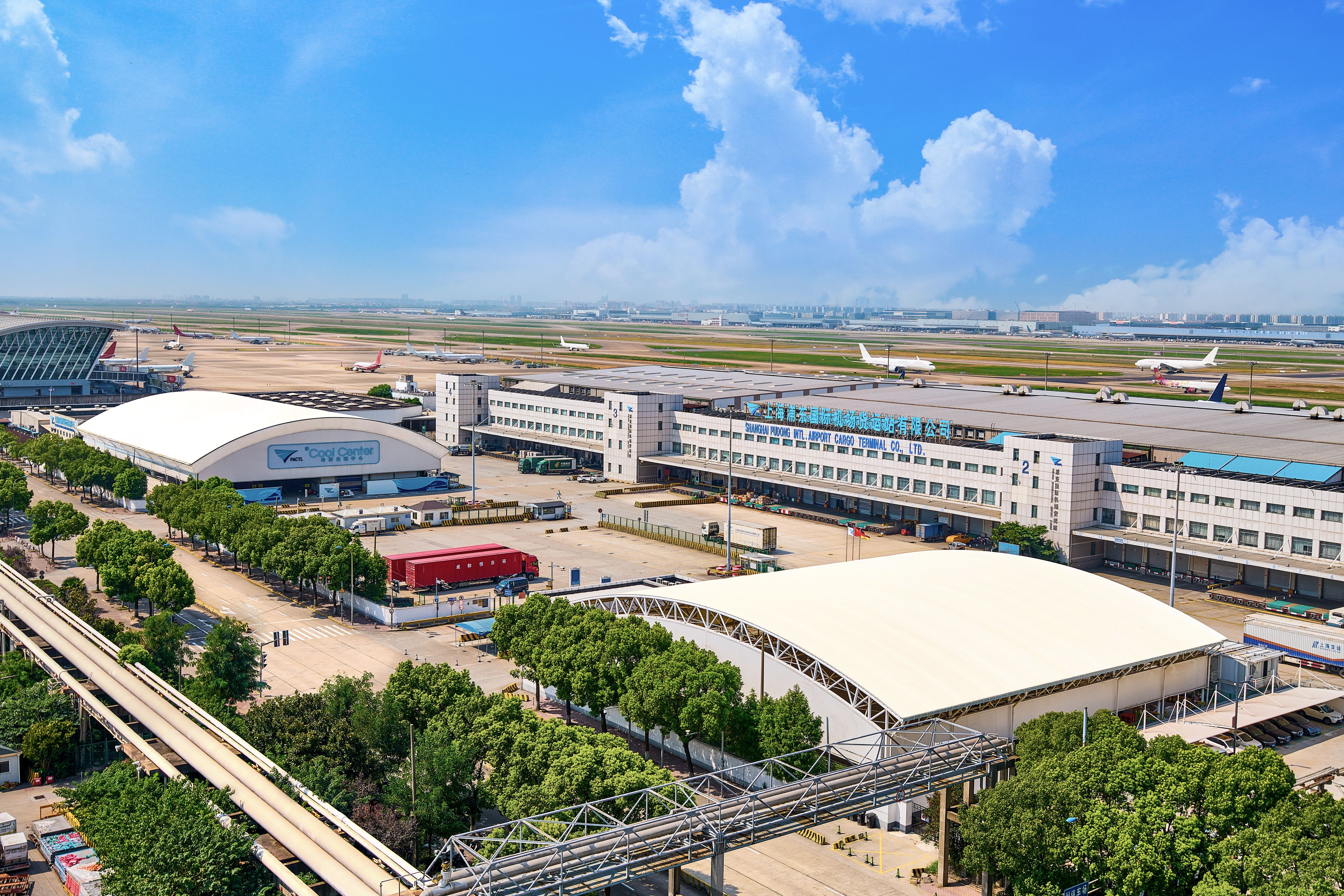
- 上海浦东国际机场货运站有限公司
- Industry: Airfreight
- Founded: October 8, 1999; 26 years ago
- Headquarters: Shanghai, China
- Website: https://www.pactl.com/

Shanghai Pudong International Airport Cargo Terminal Co., Ltd. (Chinese: 上海浦东国际机场货运站有限公司), commonly known as PACTL, is an air cargo terminal operator based at Shanghai Pudong International Airport (PVG), China. Established in 1999, the company operates cargo handling facilities at multiple airports in Shanghai and provides ground handling services for international and domestic air freight.

The company handles various types of cargo, including general cargo, live animals, perishable goods, dangerous goods (Class 1–9), valuable cargo, oversized and heavy cargo, and diplomatic mail, in accordance with applicable regulations and certifications.

== Shareholder ==
PACTL is a Sino-German joint venture engaged in air cargo handling services. The company is headquartered at Shanghai Pudong International Airport. Its shareholders are SAA Logistics Development Co., Ltd. (51%), Lufthansa Cargo AG (29%), and JHJ Logistics Management Co., Ltd. (20%).

== History ==
PACTL was established in 1999 as a Sino-German joint venture and began operations with Terminal 1 at Shanghai Pudong International Airport in the same year. In September 2005, Terminal 2 commenced operations. In December 2008, PACTL West, the largest terminal in the company's network at that time, opened. In April 2016, PACTL Cool Center, a temperature-controlled facility, began operations. In 2016, the company also established a cargo terminal operation in cooperation with Nantong Airport to expand its regional presence. Since January 2022, the company has operated the Hongqiao Airport Cargo Terminal.

PACTL operates cargo terminals at both Shanghai Pudong (PVG) and Shanghai Hongqiao (SHA) airports, with a combined terminal network covering multiple facilities and a total storage area of over 210,000 square metres. The company also operates a road feeder service network serving various regions of mainland China.

As of recent years, PACTL provides ground handling services for more than 70 airline customers and over 300 freight forwarders. It handles a wide range of cargo types and is involved in the handling of cross-border e-commerce shipments in cooperation with logistics and e-commerce operators.
